Fatima Ansari (born 12 June 1995) is a football player from Pakistan. She plays as a midfielder on the national team as well as for her club, Young Rising Stars F.F.C.

Career
Ansari started her playing career with Diya Women Football Club.

International
In October 2014, as preparation for the SAFF Championships, she participated in a three match friendly series against hosts, Bahrain. Ansari participated in the 3rd SAFF Women's Championship held in Islamabad in November 2014, where she played in all three of Pakistan's games.

References

1995 births
Footballers from Karachi
Pakistani women's footballers
Pakistan women's international footballers
Diya W.F.C. players
Young Rising Stars F.F.C. players
Living people
Women's association football midfielders